This article lists the main weightlifting events and their results for 2010.

World & Grand Prix weightlifting championships
 June 11 – ?: 2010 World Junior Weightlifting Championships in  Sofia
  won both the gold and overall medal tallies.
 July 1 – ?: 2010 World University Weightlifting Championships in  Taichung
  won both the gold and overall medal tallies.
 September 16 – 26: 2010 World Weightlifting Championships in  Antalya
  and  won 3 gold medals each. China won the overall medal tally.
 December 11 – ?: 2010 IWF Continental Clubs Grand Prix in  Penang
  won the gold medal tally.  won the overall medal tally.

Continental & regional weightlifting championships
 March 21 – ?: 2010 African Junior & Youth Weightlifting Championships in  Cairo
 Junior:  won both the gold and overall medal tallies.
 Youth:  won both the gold and overall medal tallies.
 April 2 – 11: 2010 European Weightlifting Championships in  Minsk
  won both the gold and overall medal tallies.
 April 6 – ?: 2010 Pan American Junior Weightlifting Championships in  Quito
  won both the gold and overall medal tallies.
 April 8 – ?: 2010 Asian Junior & Youth Weightlifting Championships in  Tashkent
 Junior:  won both the gold and overall medal tallies.
 Youth:  won both the gold and overall medal tallies.
 April 20 – ?: 2010 Pan American Youth Weightlifting Championships in  Chiclayo
  won the gold medal tally. Colombia and  won 11 overall medals each.
 May 4 – ?: 2010 Oceania (Senior, Junior, & Youth) Weightlifting Championships in  Suva
 Senior:  and  won 5 gold medals each. Australia won the overall medal tally.
 Junior:  won the gold medal tally.  won the overall medal tally.
 Youth:  won both the gold and overall medal tallies.
 May 18 – ?: 2010 European Youth Weightlifting Championships in  Valencia
  won the gold medal tally.  won the overall medal tally.
 May 25 – ?: 2010 Pan American Weightlifting Championships in  Guatemala City
  won both the gold and overall medal tallies.
 August 2 – ?: 2010 African Weightlifting Championships in  Yaoundé
  won both the gold and overall medal tallies.
 November 20 – ?: 2010 European Junior & U23 Weightlifting Championships in  Limassol
 Junior:  won both the gold and overall medal tallies.
 U23:  won both the gold and overall medal tallies.

References

External links
 International Weightlifting Federation Website

 
Weightlifting by year
2010 in sports